Jeff Thompson may refer to:

 M. Jeff Thompson (1826–1876), brigadier general in the Missouri State Guard during the American Civil War
 Jeff Thompson (Indiana politician), Republican member of the Indiana House of Representatives
 Jeff Thompson (Idaho politician) (born 1963), Republican member of the Idaho House of Representatives
 Jeff R. Thompson (born 1965), Republican member of the Louisiana House of Representatives
 Jeff Thompson (coach) (born 1961), American artistic gymnastics coach

See also 
 Geoff Thompson (disambiguation)
 Jeff Thomson (born 1950), Australian cricketer
 Jeffrey Thomson (disambiguation)